Larry Bowler (born July 30, 1939) was a Republican politician from the State of California. He represented suburban Sacramento in the California State Assembly from 1992 until 1998.

Pre political career 
Bowler was in the Sacramento County Sheriff's office, rising to the rank of lieutenant, for 30 years prior to becoming an assemblyman.

1988 election 
Bowler originally made an unsuccessful run for the state assembly in 1988, losing to then-Assemblyman Phil Isenberg  by a margin of 57 percent to 43 percent. More than $1.3 million was spent on the race.

References

External links 
 Election History of State of California

Republican Party members of the California State Assembly
Living people
1939 births
20th-century American politicians